Khaing Khaing Maw (born February 5, 1979) is a former wushu athlete from Myanmar. She is a one-time world champion and a double silver medalist at the World Wushu Championships. She also won the gold medal in women's taijiquan at the 2001 Southeast Asian Games. At the 2002 Asian Games, she won the gold medal in women's taijiquan, Myanmar's first medal in wushu at the Asian Games. Her last competition was at the 2004 Asian Wushu Championships where she won a gold medal in taijiquan.

See also 

 List of Asian Games medalists in wushu

References 

1979 births
Living people
Burmese wushu practitioners
Medalists at the 2002 Asian Games
Asian Games medalists in wushu
Wushu practitioners at the 2002 Asian Games
Asian Games gold medalists for Myanmar
Southeast Asian Games gold medalists for Myanmar
Southeast Asian Games silver medalists for Myanmar